Louis Serre may refer to:

Louis Serre (physician)
Louis Serre (politician)